Ekaterina Koneva (born 25 September 1988) is a Russian track and field athlete who competes in the triple jump. She is a triple-time gold medalist at the Summer Universiade.

Career
Born in Khabarovsk in the Russian SFSR, she started out as a sprint and long jump specialist. She failed an in-competition doping test in February 2007 for excess testosterone and was banned from competition for two years. She returned from the ban in 2009 and set personal bests of 11.76 seconds for the 100 metres and 23.89 seconds for the 200 metres. She switched to focus on the triple jump in 2010 and won the Russian under-23 title and came second at the under-23 Spartakiad.

Koneva cleared fourteen metres for the first time in 2011 setting an indoor best of 14.18 metres at the Russian Indoor Athletics Championships. Two personal bests came in Bryansk, where she had 6.70 m in the long jump and 14.46 m in the triple jump. She placed third at the Russian Athletics Championships before going on to take the gold medal at the Universiade. At the start of 2012 she cleared a personal best of 14.60 m – a mark which ranked her tenth in the world for the triple jump that year. She came third at the Russian indoor championships but fared less well outdoors, managing only tenth at the Russian Championships.

Further improvements came in 2013: she won at the Russian team championships with a best of 14.80 m and she was runner-up at the 2013 European Team Championships. She improved this by two centimetres to defend her triple jump title at the Universiade in Kazan, setting a Games record in the process. She was also victorious at the Brothers Znamensky Memorial – one of the top annual meets in Russia. She claimed her first win on the IAAF Diamond League circuit with a jump of 14.52 m at the London Grand Prix.

International competitions

See also
List of doping cases in athletics
List of World Athletics Championships medalists (women)
List of European Athletics Championships medalists (women)
List of European Athletics Indoor Championships medalists (women)
List of IAAF World Indoor Championships medalists (women)

References

External links
 

1988 births
Living people
Sportspeople from Khabarovsk
Russian female triple jumpers
Russian female long jumpers
Russian female sprinters
Universiade gold medalists in athletics (track and field)
Universiade gold medalists for Russia
Medalists at the 2011 Summer Universiade
Medalists at the 2013 Summer Universiade
Medalists at the 2015 Summer Universiade
World Athletics Championships athletes for Russia
World Athletics Championships medalists
World Athletics Indoor Championships winners
European Athletics Championships medalists
European Athletics Indoor Championships winners
Russian Athletics Championships winners
Doping cases in athletics
Russian sportspeople in doping cases